Munich is home to a number of football clubs, and has hosted games in two FIFA World Cups, including  Germany's victory in the 1974 FIFA World Cup Final.

Clubs 
FC Bayern Munich have won a record 31 national championships, along with 20 German Cups, 6 League Cups, 8 DFL-Supercups, 6 UEFA Champions League/European Cups, 1 UEFA Cup, 1 UEFA Cup Winners' Cup, 2 UEFA Super Cups, 2 Intercontinental Cups and 1 FIFA Club World Cup for a total of 78 trophies. 

TSV 1860 Munich contest the Munich derby with Bayern and have won 1 National Championship along with 2 DFB Cups. 1860 and Bayern both played in the city's Olympiastadion before moving to the 75,000 capacity Allianz Arena in 2005. Bayern Munich's reserve team, Bayern II, won the 2019–20 3. Liga but were denied promotion to the 2. Bundesliga as reserve teams are not allowed to play in the top two tiers of German football. 

Other clubs in the city include, SpVgg Helios München, Türkgücü München, FC Wacker München, BSC Sendling. Türkgücü München secured promotion to the 3. Liga for the first time in their history in 2020. As of the 2020–21 season, there are three Munich clubs in Germany's third tier (Bayern II, 1860 and Türkgücü).

List of current clubs

Men's football
As of the beginning of the 2020–21 season.

Women's football 
As of the beginning of the 2020–21 season.

Munich derbies 

The Munich derby is the name given to football matches between FC Bayern Munich and TSV 1860 Munich, both of them from Munich, Germany.

Major competitions

1974 FIFA World Cup

The Munich Olympic Stadium (Olympiastadion) was the site of the final match of the 1974 FIFA World Cup between the sides of Netherlands and Germany finishing 2–1 to the host nation.

2006 FIFA World Cup

Munich was one of the cities named for the 2006 FIFA World Cup. Allianz Arena was built to host the matches played in Munich instead of Olympic Stadium.

The following games were played at the stadium during the World Cup of 2006:

UEFA Euro 1988

The 1988 UEFA European Football Championship final tournament was held in West Germany. It was the eighth European Football Championship, which is held every four years and supported by UEFA. The final tournament took place between 10 and 25 June 1988 with Munich hosting the final in the Olympiastadion. The tournament eventually crowned Netherlands as European champions for the first, and so far only time with Marco van Basten's iconic goal sealing a famous 2-0 win for the Dutch against the Soviet Union.

Euro 88 was a rare occurrence of a major football tournament being completed without a single player being sent off, any knockout matches going into extra time or penalties and having at least one goal scored in every match.

European club competition finals

UEFA Champions League/European Champions Cup Finals

Won by Bayern Munich

Bayern Munich have won six European Cups, including three straight titles in the mid 1970s, one each in 2001 and 2013 and, most recently, in 2020.

Held in Munich

1979 European Cup Final

The 1979 European Cup Final was a football match held in Olympiastadion on 30 May 1979, that saw Nottingham Forest of England defeat Malmö FF of Sweden 1–0.

1993 UEFA Champions League Final

The 1993 UEFA Champions League Final was a football match between French club Marseille and Italy's Milan, played on 26 May 1993 in Olympiastadion. Marseille won the match 1–0.

1997 UEFA Champions League Final

The 1997 UEFA Champions League Final was a football match played between Borussia Dortmund of Germany and Juventus from Italy. The event took place in Olympiastadion on 28 May 1997. Borussia Dortmund wore their traditional yellow and black shirts, while Juventus donned their blue away kit. Dortmud won the match 3–1.

2012 UEFA Champions League Final

The 2012 UEFA Champions League Final was the final match of the 2011–12 UEFA Champions League, the 57th season of the UEFA Champions League football tournament and the 20th since it was renamed from the European Champion Clubs' Cup. The match was played at the Allianz Arena and won by Chelsea, who beat Bayern Munich on penalties after extra time.

Famous footballers from Munich 
 Franz Beckenbauer
 Philipp Lahm

See also
Sport in Munich
Football in Germany
Football in Berlin

References

External links